The Men of the Immaculata (MOTI) was founded in 2017 in the Diocese of Baton Rouge. It is an organization that hosts annual Catholic men's conferences. Scott L. Smith, Jr. is currently serving as the Chairman of the Men of the Immaculata.

The organization's annual conference program, edited by Scott L. Smith, Jr., is The Catholic ManBook.

2021 Conference

The 2021 Men of the Immaculata conference will include Deacon Harold Burke-Sivers, Dr. Allen Hunt, and Father Reuben Dykes as speakers. The 2021 theme is "St. Joseph, Pillar of Families, Protector of the Church, and Terror of Demons". Attendees will be encouraged to undertake the Consecration to St. Joseph created by Father Donald Calloway, MIC.

References

External links
 

Catholic organizations established in the 21st century
Volunteer cooperatives
21st-century Catholicism
Catholic spirituality